inXile Entertainment, Inc. is an American video game developer and a studio of Xbox Game Studios based in Tustin, California. Specializing in role-playing video games, inXile was founded in 2002 by Interplay co-founder Brian Fargo. The studio produced the fantasy games The Bard's Tale and Hunted: The Demon's Forge, along with various games for Flash and iOS such as Fantastic Contraption in its first decade of development. In 2012, inXile released the post-apocalyptic game Wasteland 2, following a successful Kickstarter campaign. Following the game's critical success, the studio went on to raise a then-record US$4 million on Kickstarter to develop Torment: Tides of Numenera, a spiritual successor to Interplay's Planescape: Torment. inXile has since finished developing Wasteland 3.

History 
inXile Entertainment was founded on October 26, 2002, by Brian Fargo in Newport Beach, California.

In an interview with Joystiq, inXile's President Matthew Findley shared some of the company's history: "I worked with Brian Fargo at Interplay for a number of years and we both left Interplay at the same time. We knew we wanted to stay in video games, so starting a company seemed like a good idea -- he spent 20 years at Interplay and I was there for 13. When we were first out there, trying to figure out what to do next, we kinda felt like we were in exile, and we made fake cards with a fake company name just to have a card to go to E3 with. And before we ever thought of the name "inXile", Brian put as his job description on the cards: "Leader in exile." People got such a kick out of that card, we kept saying "in exile, in exile, in exile" so much that we just thought, "Why not make up a new word?" And so we did."

In May 2008, inXile announced the creation of SparkWorkz, an online business division with a focus on user-generated content, using their experience with Line Rider as base for the venture. David Heeley, a former executive for Microsoft, was hired to oversee the creation of the division.

In April 2012, inXile launched a Kickstarter campaign to fund Wasteland 2, the sequel to Interplay's Wasteland, with most of the original team on board. The crowdfunding drive raised more than 300% of its initial goal of $900,000, ending at $2,933,252. In March 2013, inXile returned to Kickstarter to crowdfund Torment: Tides of Numenera. The Kickstarter for Torment: Tides of Numenera broke the record of fastest Kickstart drive to $1 million, raising that amount in seven hours and two minutes.

During a Kickstarter campaign for the game Wasteland 2, Brian Fargo developed the Kicking it Forward program. Under this program, inXile Entertainment pledged to use 5% of post-launch net profits to back future Kickstarter projects.

In November 2018, Microsoft Studios announced they were in the final stages of acquiring InXile, as well as Obsidian Entertainment, another studio known for its role-playing games. According to Fargo, they were approached in April 2018 by Noah Musler, one of Microsoft's business development executives that had former ties to the studio, who suggested the possibility of acquisition. Fargo believed the acquisition was beneficial for the studio, as at the time, they were in the "uncanny valley" between more independent game development and high-budget AAA games where there was a significant difference in expectations on quality and pricing of the game. Microsoft's support would help them make games that are closer to AAA games and better compete in the current state of the industry.

In October 2015, inXile opened inXile New Orleans as a second studio based in New Orleans. The Newport Beach office was moved to Tustin by January 2021.

Games developed

References

External links 
 

2002 establishments in California
2018 mergers and acquisitions
American companies established in 2002
Companies based in Newport Beach, California
First-party video game developers
Microsoft subsidiaries
Video game companies based in California
Video game companies established in 2002
Video game development companies
Xbox Game Studios